Cytherella is a genus of seed shrimp in the family Cytherellidae.

Species 
The World Register of Marine Species lists the following species as accepted in the genus Cytherella.

Cytherella abyssorum 
Cytherella adenensis 
Cytherella africana 
Cytherella altacaelateralis 
Cytherella alvearium 
Cytherella areolata 
Cytherella arostrata 
Cytherella ascia
Cytherella ballangei 
Cytherella banda 
Cytherella bathyalis 
Cytherella beibuwanensis 
Cytherella bensoni 
Cytherella bermaguiensis 
Cytherella bermudensis 
Cytherella bigemina 
Cytherella bipartita 
Cytherella bissoni 
Cytherella bradyi 
Cytherella brettingi 
Cytherella caepae 
Cytherella calabra 
Cytherella carmela 
Cytherella centrocompressa 
Cytherella cercinata 
Cytherella charmant 
Cytherella chipolensis 
Cytherella cincta 
Cytherella circumpunctata 
Cytherella complanata 
Cytherella compressa 
Cytherella consanguinea 
Cytherella corpusculum 
Cytherella cribrosa 
Cytherella cuneata 
Cytherella cuneiformis 
Cytherella cuneolus 
Cytherella dictyon 
Cytherella dilatata 
Cytherella discostata 
Cytherella dromedaria 
Cytherella eburnea 
Cytherella eburnea 
Cytherella elliptica 
Cytherella eros 
Cytherella fimbricinctus 
Cytherella fischeri 
Cytherella fragum 
Cytherella gambiensis 
Cytherella gingensis 
Cytherella gloria 
Cytherella grindrodiana 
Cytherella grossmani 
Cytherella gunnelli 
Cytherella harpago 
Cytherella harrymutvei 
Cytherella hemipuncta 
Cytherella hermargentina 
Cytherella hiatus 
Cytherella hispida 
Cytherella incohata 
Cytherella interpunctata 
Cytherella intonsa 
Cytherella intumescens 
Cytherella iowensis 
Cytherella iraqiensis 
Cytherella japonica 
Cytherella javaseaensis 
Cytherella joalensis 
Cytherella jonesi 
Cytherella kellettae 
Cytherella kempfi 
Cytherella kingstonensis 
Cytherella kirkukiensis 
Cytherella kornickeri 
Cytherella laevis 
Cytherella laevis 
Cytherella laganella 
Cytherella lata 
Cytherella leizhouensis 
Cytherella londinensis 
Cytherella luciae 
Cytherella lucida 
Cytherella ludbrookae 
Cytherella lustris 
Cytherella maculosa 
Cytherella maddocks 
Cytherella maremensis 
Cytherella mejanguerensis 
Cytherella micrometrica 
Cytherella mientienensis 
Cytherella minutissima 
Cytherella mushoriensis 
Cytherella namibensis 
Cytherella nitida 
Cytherella notossinuosa 
Cytherella nyssa 
Cytherella obtusata 
Cytherella ochthodes 
Cytherella olosa 
Cytherella omatsolai 
Cytherella ondaatjei 
Cytherella optima 
Cytherella ovalis 
Cytherella ovalis 
Cytherella ovalis 
Cytherella ovata 
Cytherella ovularia 
Cytherella pandora 
Cytherella papillosolineata 
Cytherella paraibensis 
Cytherella parallela 
Cytherella paranitida 
Cytherella pelotensis 
Cytherella permutata 
Cytherella pindoramensis 
Cytherella pinnata 
Cytherella pleistocenica 
Cytherella plusminusve 
Cytherella polita 
Cytherella ponderosa 
Cytherella pori 
Cytherella postagrena 
Cytherella posterodorsodirecta 
Cytherella posterospinosa 
Cytherella posterotuberculata 
Cytherella proxima 
Cytherella pulchra 
Cytherella pumila 
Cytherella pumpkinae 
Cytherella punctata 
Cytherella pyriformis 
Cytherella reticulata 
Cytherella retroflexa 
Cytherella richteriana 
Cytherella rizzolensis 
Cytherella robusta 
Cytherella russoiforma 
Cytherella rwhatleyi 
Cytherella sangiranensis 
Cytherella santosensis 
Cytherella saraballentae 
Cytherella scotica 
Cytherella scutulum 
Cytherella semitalis 
Cytherella sericea 
Cytherella serpentiensis 
Cytherella serratula 
Cytherella serrulata 
Cytherella shengmu 
Cytherella shiranishensis 
Cytherella sicula 
Cytherella similis 
Cytherella speciosa 
Cytherella stainforthi 
Cytherella texana 
Cytherella textum 
Cytherella thrakiensis 
Cytherella truncata 
Cytherella truncata 
Cytherella truncatoides 
Cytherella tumidosa 
Cytherella turgidula 
Cytherella tyronica 
Cytherella vandenboldi 
Cytherella ventercavus 
Cytherella venusta 
Cytherella vermillionensis 
Cytherella vesiculosa 
Cytherella vizcainoensis 
Cytherella vraspillaii 
Cytherella vulgata 
Cytherella vulgatella 
Cytherella vulna 
Cytherella watkinsi 
Cytherella weaveri 
Cytherella yangchieni 
Cytherella yaoshou

References

Crustaceans described in 1849
Podocopa
Podocopa genera